Richard Lucy may refer to:
Richard Lucy (1619–1677), landowner and politician, MP for Warwickshire, and for Yarmouth
Sir Richard Lucy, 1st Baronet (1592–1667), English politician, MP for Old Sarum, and for Hertfordshire 
Richard Lucy (fl. 1563), MP for Brackley